Louise Lyons (born 1976) is an Irish equestrian.

She competed at the 2008 Summer Olympics in Beijing, where she was part of the Irish team that placed 8th in the team eventing competition. She also competed in individual eventing.

References

1976 births
Living people
Irish female equestrians
Olympic equestrians of Ireland
Equestrians at the 2008 Summer Olympics